Tashmuryn (Taşmoron) is a rural locality (a village) in Akhunovsky Selsoviet, Uchalinsky District, Bashkortostan, Russia. The population was 1 as of 2010.

Geography 
Tashmuryn is located 32 km southeast of Uchaly (the district's administrative centre) by road. Kidysh is the nearest rural locality.

References 

Rural localities in Uchalinsky District